Yuzu is a citrus fruit native to East Asia.

Yuzu may also refer to:

 Yuzu (band), a J-Pop band formed in 1997
 Yuzu (emulator), an open-source emulator for the Nintendo Switch console
 Yuzu Kurosaki, a character in the anime and manga series Bleach
 Yuzu Miyashiro, a character in the Da Capo series of visual novels
 Yuzu Mizutani, creator of the Japanese shōjo manga Magical × Miracle
 Yuzu Nembutsu, nembutsu in some forms of Pure Land Buddhism
 Yuzu tea, a Korean beverage
 Yuzu, an online education platform provided by Barnes & Noble Nook
 Yuzu Aihara, a fictional character from the yuri manga Citrus